Norman Schellenger (born January 12, 1961) is an American former professional tennis player.

Born in Miami, Schellenger was a collegiate tennis player for Virginia Commonwealth University and competed on the professional tour in the 1980s, reaching a best singles world ranking of 254. He made the second round of the 1985 U.S. Clay Court Championships and featured in the qualifying draw for the 1987 Wimbledon Championships.

ATP Challenger finals

Doubles: 1 (0–1)

References

External links
 
 

1961 births
Living people
American male tennis players
Tennis players from Miami
VCU Rams athletes
College men's tennis players in the United States